Bush is an unincorporated community in Laurel County, Kentucky, United States. Bush had a post office, which opened on February 18, 1840, and closed on January 22, 2011; it still has its own ZIP code, 40724.

References

Unincorporated communities in Laurel County, Kentucky
Unincorporated communities in Kentucky